Fort Hamer is an unincorporated area in Manatee County, Florida, United States, and was the name of a short-lived U.S. Army fort in eastern Manatee County. Although the area is named for Fort Hamer, the former military installation has never been precisely located through historical or archaeological research.

History
Fort Hamer was established on November 28, 1849, as part of an order by Major General David E. Twiggs to remove Seminole people from Florida after various pioneer outposts in the state were attacked by Seminole outsiders. Named after Gen. Thomas L. Hamer, a brigadier general and strong ally of Andrew Jackson, the fort consisted of several log buildings including a hospital, commissary, hay barn and accommodations for around 165 soldiers at its inception. The stretch of forts constructed under General Twiggs's command were abandoned only a year after opening. In 1856, during the Third Seminole War, Fort Hamer was once again used in service. Here, a detachment of 10 men in Capt. William Hooker's Company from the Florida Mounted Volunteers were stationed. Twenty-seven years after the fort was first established, Fort Hamer was decommissioned. On Feb. 26, 1876, the War Department formally turned over the property to the Department of the Interior.

By 1895, none of the fort remained. The area was described as a sandy bank on the Manatee River that was a popular location for boating and day-trips.

References

Unincorporated communities in Manatee County, Florida
Unincorporated communities in Florida
Hamer
Hamer
1849 establishments in Florida